Karu is a Local Government Area in Nasarawa State, central Nigeria. It is close in proximity to the Federal Capital Territory of Nigeria. It has an area of 2,640 km2. Karu local government has its headquarters in New Karu town. It was originally built to house the capital's civil servants and lower income families, but had no running water or good sanitation system. Karu has grown in population beyond its original planned capacity. Ensure Administrative convenience and bring government closer to the grass root people, Karshi Development Area was created with its administrative secretariat at Uke.

Demographics
According to the 2006 census, the population of mainly New Karu town was 205,477.

Education 
Loyola Jesuit College is in Gidan Mangoro, Karu.
K-Bols International School is in Auta Balefi, New Karu.

St. Augustine's College is in New Karu, Karu.

Transportation 
The Karu urban area is served by an express way connecting Karu to Abuja, Nigeria's capital city, and to other parts of the country.

Postal code 
The postal code of the area is 961.

Villages 
 

Kuchikau
One Man Village
Masaka
Uke
Tudunwada

See also 

Greater Karu Urban Area

References

Local Government Areas in Nasarawa State